Jason Detwiler (born 1975), is an American baritone opera singer.

With over fifty roles to his credit, Detwiler has become well known for his magnetic and energizing stage performances. Favoring Mozart, bel canto and French roles, his voice and acting have been described as "richly expressive", "emotionally engaging", with a "commanding stage presence". He possesses a diverse repertoire ranging from the comedic Papageno (Die Zauberflöte) and Guglielmo (Cosi fan tutte) to the dramatic Germont (La traviata) and Escamillo (Carmen). Among his most widely acclaimed roles are the title roles of Il barbiere di Siviglia and Eugene Onegin, as well as Malatesta (Don Pasquale), Zurga (Les pêcheurs de perles), and John Proctor (The Crucible). His concert credits include: Bach's St. John's Passion, Haydn's Creation, Mozart's  Requiem, Fauré's Requiem,  Handel's Messiah, Beethoven's Ninth Symphony, Dvořák's Te Deum, Saint-Saëns' Christmas Oratorio, Mollicone's Beatitude Mass, Ahab in Bernard Herrmann's Moby Dick and Einhorn's Voices of Light.

The 2012–2013 season showed a number of local appearances in his hometown. With a return to the Boise Philharmonic to take part in their first Picnic at the Pops: Music of Gershwin, Detwiler then expanded his repertoire with Ford (Falstaff), Peter (Hansel and Gretel), a staged version of Schubert’s Winterreise and a reprise of Silvio in I pagliacci, all with Opera Idaho. In the spring, he returned to Stockton Opera and debuted with Wichita Grand Opera reprising Almaviva (Le nozze di Figaro). In addition, he sang with Cinnabar Theater as Escamillo. Highlights of the 2013–2014 season include another Almaviva, Gianni Schicchi and his first Sam in Trouble in Tahiti with Opera Idaho. Along with his wife, Michele, Detwiler has also toured throughout Idaho performing sacred music and sharing their love story in a concert entitled "With No Love Greater Than His".

He has performed nationally with San Diego Opera, Virginia Opera, Opéra Théâtre d'Avignon, Opera Santa Barbara, Opera Parallèle, Center for Contemporary Opera, Syracuse Opera, Sacramento Opera, Spokane Opera, Opéra Louisiane, Shreveport Opera, Festival Opera of Walnut Creek, Opera Coeur d'Alene, Rimrock Opera, Sonoma City Opera, West Bay Opera, Trinity Lyric Opera, Vallejo Symphony Orchestra, the American Philharmonic Sonoma County, the Idaho State-Civic Symphony, the Boise Philharmonic, the Boise Master Chorale, the Masterworks Chorale of San Mateo and the Auburn Symphony. From 2002–2006, he was part of Irene Dalis' Opera San Jose as a Principal Resident Artist. While there, he sang Dandini (La cenerentola), Falke (Die Fledermaus), Papageno, Valentin, Silvio (I pagliacci), Escamillo, Marcello (La bohème), John Proctor, and the title roles of Mozart's Don Giovanni and Figaro among others. In 2009–2010, Detwiler became Opera Idaho's first Artist-in-Residence, singing lead roles, giving concerts, and leading master classes for the Resident Company. Other major roles include Yeletsky (Pikovaya Dama), Mr. Gobineau (The Medium), Harlekin (Ariadne auf Naxos), Mr. Webb in Ned Rorem's Our Town, Nick Carraway (The Great Gatsby), Sharpless (Madama Butterfly), Renato (Un ballo in maschera), the title roles in Verdi's Macbeth and Vaughan Williams' Pilgrim's Progress, and Billy Bigelow (Carousel).

Currently, Detwiler resides in Boise, Idaho with his wife, mezzo-soprano Michele Detwiler, and their two children.

Engagements 2014-2015

Main roles

On stage

 Papageno (Die Zauberflöte)
 Nick Carraway (The Great Gatsby)
 Count Almaviva (Le nozze di Figaro)
 Malatesta (Don Pasquale)
 Belcore (L'elisir d'amore)

 Figaro (Il barbiere di Siviglia)
  Athanaël (Thaïs)
 Zurga (Les pechêurs de perles)
 Riccardo (I puritani)
 Yeletsky (Pique Dame)

 Onegin (Eugene Onegin)
 Pilgrim (The Pilgrim's Progress)
 Schaunard (La bohème)
 Ford (Falstaff)
 John Proctor (The Crucible)

In concert

 St. John's Passion (Bach)
 Messiah (Handel)
 Requiem (Mozart)

 Requiem (Fauré)
 Creation (Haydn)
 Ninth Symphony (Beethoven)
 Christmas Oratorio (Saint-Saëns)
 Te Deum (Dvořák)
 Voices of Light (Einhorn)
 Beatitude Mass (Mollicone)
 Moby Dick (Ahab) (Bernard Herrmann)

References
Notes

External links
www.operasj.org Opera San Jose Biography
www.jasondetwiler.net/www.detwileropera.com Official Website

American operatic baritones
Living people
1975 births
Place of birth missing (living people)
Singers from California
21st-century American singers
Classical musicians from California
21st-century American male singers